Auster Point is a headland midway along the east shore of Charcot Bay, Trinity Peninsula. It was named by the UK Antarctic Place-Names Committee after the Auster aircraft used by British expeditions in this area.

References
 

Headlands of Trinity Peninsula